Greenway is an unincorporated community in McPherson County, in the U.S. state of South Dakota.

History
Greenway got its start in 1902 when the Milwaukee Railroad was extended to that point. A post office was established at Greenway in 1902, and remained in operation until 1976.

References

Unincorporated communities in McPherson County, South Dakota
Unincorporated communities in South Dakota